Continental Center is a 26-story,  skyscraper in Downtown Columbus, Ohio. It is the 14th tallest building in Columbus. It was completed in 1973 and designed by architectural firm Brubaker/Brandt. The building follows a modernist architectural style and has been known as the Ohio Bell Building and the Ameritech Building. The building was added to the National Register of Historic Places in 2021.

History 
Designed by Brubaker/Brandt for the Ohio Bell Telephone Company, the building was constructed from 1970 to 1973, with an approximate cost of $20 million.

The building was sold in 2021 for $12 million. In 2022, the new owners began making plans to convert its office spaces into 330 apartment units.

See also
List of tallest buildings in Columbus, Ohio
National Register of Historic Places listings in Columbus, Ohio

References

External links
 

Skyscraper office buildings in Columbus, Ohio
Buildings in downtown Columbus, Ohio
Office buildings completed in 1973
Brutalist architecture in Ohio